Schuks Tshabalala's Survival Guide to South Africa is a 2010 comedy film directed by Gray Hofmeyr, co-written by Gray Hofmeyr and Leon Schuster, and starring Leon Schuster and Alfred Ntombela.

The film was created to coincide with the 2010 FIFA World Cup which was held in South Africa.

Plot 
Schuks Tshabalala (Leon Schuster) and Shorty (Alfred Ntombela) are producing a survival guide to South Africa for tourists visiting the country for the 2010 FIFA World Cup. They take a group of tourists from Germany, Ireland, Greece, China, France, India and The Netherlands and show them what life is like in South Africa. However, the South Africa they see is one created entirely by Tshabalala and Shorty.

References

External links 
 

2010 films
Afrikaans-language films
Films set in South Africa
2010 comedy films
South African comedy films
English-language South African films
2010s English-language films